The white hake or mud hake (Urophycis tenuis) is a phycid hake. It is found in the deeper waters in the northwest Atlantic Ocean.

Description 
The species can grow to be up to 30 cm by the end of the first year, and 400 mm if male and 480 mm if female by the first reproduction.

Distribution and habitat 

Reproduction and development 
Spawning season for the white hake starts in late winter or early spring. It has been difficult to study the breeding habits of the white hake due to researchers’ issue with finding ripe females. Studies have found that larvae for the species occur in warm Slope Sea waters, but further along in development, the species can be found in continental shelf waters.

References 

Phycidae
Fish of the Atlantic Ocean
Fish described in 1814
Taxa named by Samuel L. Mitchill